Gambito is a surname. Notable people with the surname include:
 Christine Gambito (born 1976), American Internet personality, actress, and comedian
 Sarah Gambito, American poet and professor